Eberz House is a historic home located in the Black Rock neighborhood of  Buffalo in Erie County, New York. It was built about 1892, and is a -story, wood-frame Queen Anne-style dwelling on a stone foundation. It features a highly decorated front porch with turned spindlework and textured surfaces.  The Eberz family rented rooms for visitors to the Pan-American Exposition in 1901.

It was listed on the National Register of Historic Places in 2011.

References

External links
Buffalo as an Architectural Museum: Eberz House

Houses on the National Register of Historic Places in New York (state)
Queen Anne architecture in New York (state)
Houses completed in 1892
Houses in Buffalo, New York
National Register of Historic Places in Buffalo, New York